Toschi may refer to:

Plural form of Tosco, synonym of Toscano, meaning "from Tuscany"
Dave Toschi (1931–2018), former inspector in the San Francisco Police Department
Giulio Carlo de' Toschi di Fagnano (1682–1766), marquis de Toschi, Italian mathematician
Paolo Toschi (1788–1854), Italian draughtsman and engraver
Pier Francesco d'Jacopo di Domenico Toschi (died 1567), Italian painter
Domenico Toschi (1535–1620), Italian cardinal

See also
Etruscan (disambiguation)
Tuscan (disambiguation)
Tuscany (disambiguation)